La Bisbal de Falset is a municipality in the comarca of the Priorat in Catalonia, Spain.

The economy is mostly based on agriculture, with production of olives and olive oil.

References

 Panareda Clopés, Josep Maria; Rios Calvet, Jaume; Rabella Vives, Josep Maria (1989). Guia de Catalunya, Barcelona: Caixa de Catalunya.  (Spanish).  (Catalan).

External links
Official website 
 Government data pages 

Municipalities in Priorat
Populated places in Priorat